Re di Roma is a train station on the Rome Metro. It is on Line A and is located in Appio Latino, between San Giovanni and Ponte Lungo stations.

It is located under Piazza Re di Roma, from which it gets its name.

References

External links

Rome Metro Line A stations
Railway stations opened in 1980
1980 establishments in Italy
Rome Q. VIII Tuscolano
Rome Q. IX Appio-Latino
Railway stations in Italy opened in the 20th century